Reinold Geiger (born July 1947)  is an Austrian billionaire, and the chairman and CEO of French cosmetics retailer L'Occitane en Provence.

Education 
He received a bachelor's degree in engineering from the Swiss Federal Institute of Technology in Zürich, in 1969, and an MBA degree from INSEAD, Fontainebleau (France) in 1976.

Personal life 
Geiger is married, and lives in Geneva, Switzerland.

References

1947 births
Living people
Austrian billionaires
Austrian businesspeople
Austrian expatriates in Switzerland
ETH Zurich alumni
Businesspeople from Geneva